WDOK (102.1 FM) is a commercial radio station licensed to Cleveland, Ohio, known as "Star 102" and featuring an adult contemporary format. Owned by Audacy, Inc., the station serves Greater Cleveland and surrounding Northeast Ohio. WDOK's studios are located at the Halle Building in Downtown Cleveland while the transmitter is in the Cleveland suburb of Parma. In addition to a standard analog transmission, WDOK broadcasts in HD Radio and is available online via Audacy.

History

Beautiful music
The station signed on as WDOK-FM on October 4, 1954, simulcasting its sister station, WDOK (1260 AM). Eventually, WDOK-FM originated its own programming and featured a beautiful music format. On December 12, 1965, the AM station changed its call sign to WIXY and adopted a Top 40 format. That allowed FM 102.1 to drop the FM suffix, now identifying as WDOK. The station was branded "Stereo Cleveland", with the slogan "Beautiful Music for the Lands of the Western Reserve."

Station personalities and voice overs included Wayne Mack, the founder of WDOK's beautiful music format and producer of the many memorable monthly odes and station breaks that he composed and set to music; Ken Nordine (the famous voice of Word Jazz), Tom Armstrong, previously the morning host at WGAR AM in the 1940s and 50s; and David Mark, who also worked for Cleveland market "beautiful music" stations WQAL, WKSW, WJW (AM), and WDBN. The station was programmed by Peter Irmiter and Neil Hershberger after they went live.

By the 1980s, WDOK had come under common ownership with WWWE; both stations were sold on November 30, 1987 by Lake Erie Radio Company, owned by Art Modell and Al Lerner, to the Independent Group Limited partnership, owned by Tom Embrescia, Larry Pollock, and Tom Wilson.

Soft Rock 102.1
By the mid-1980s, WDOK's beautiful music format had brightened, with more vocals being played from such "soft rock" artists such as James Taylor and Elton John. Ratings remained high, but the format attracted mostly older listeners in advertiser-unfriendly demographics and not the younger audiences courted by advertisers. So WDOK made the final and complete switch to a soft adult contemporary format in 1987 with Sue Wilson as program director. 

The station promoted its new AC format with TV commercials announcing that it was "coming out of the elevator" (as in "elevator music"). WDOK initially positioned itself midway between beautiful music (which continued for a few more years on WQAL) and the mainstream AC format played on WLTF and WMJI.

New 102/Star 102
On January 9, 2012, WDOK debuted a new and more up tempo playlist (going from Soft AC to more mainstream AC), re-branded as "The New 102", complete with an updated logo and imaging. On November 13, 2012, WDOK moved from its longtime studio home at One Radio Lane, off East Saint Clair Avenue in Downtown Cleveland, to the Halle Building on Euclid Avenue, also Downtown. Sister station WQAL joined WDOK in the move; as a result, all four Cleveland CBS Radio stations are now located in the same building.

Longtime WDOK morning host "Trapper" Jack Elliot announced on December 19, 2012 that the station had opted not to renew the contracts of both he and cohost Jim McIntyre, much to the dismay of many listeners. On April 3, 2015, WDOK rebranded as "Star 102".

On February 2, 2017, CBS Radio announced it would merge with Entercom. The merger was approved on November 9, 2017, and was consummated on the 17th.

Christmas music
Traditionally, WDOK plays Christmas music throughout the holiday season under the brand "Christmas 102", usually beginning around mid-November. 

In December 2018, after the station did its annual switch to all Christmas music, WDOK decided to stop playing the well-known 1944 Christmas song Baby, It's Cold Outside, saying the lyrics seemed inappropriate in a time of the #MeToo movement, with increasing sensitivity and awareness of sexual manipulation and harassment of women. The station's move sparked national, and even international, attention and controversy.

Current programming
The weekday schedule includes WDOK personalities Jen Toohey and Tim Richards (mornings), Liz Campbell (middays), Glenn Anderson (afternoons), and Jim Hart (evenings). WDOK is also the Cleveland affiliate for America's Greatest Hits with Scott Shannon, which is heard on the weekends.

The HD2 digital subchannel formerly broadcast an adult album alternative format under the brand "The Coffee Shop". It has since been turned off.

References

External links

Cleveland Broadcast Radio Archives: WDOK timeline

1954 establishments in Ohio
Mainstream adult contemporary radio stations in the United States
Radio stations established in 1954
DOK
Audacy, Inc. radio stations